Ola Høyland  (25 May 1890 – 18 May 1981) was a Norwegian politician.

He was born in Stord to Ola Høyland and Brita Hovdeland. He was elected representative to the Storting for the period 1954–1957 for the Farmers' Party.

References

1890 births
1981 deaths
People from Stord
Centre Party (Norway) politicians
Members of the Storting